William J. Burgess (died September 25, 1996) was an American politician from Maryland. He served as a member of the Maryland House of Delegates, representing District 9 from 1979 to 1982 and representing District 8 from 1983 to 1990.

Early life and education
William J. Burgess was born in Boston, Massachusetts. He attended high school in Boston.

Burgess graduated from Johns Hopkins University night school with a degree in electrical engineering.

Career
Burgess served as a tail gunner on B-29s during World War II. He was a recipient of the Air Medal and the Distinguished Flying Cross. In total, he served in the armed forces for 12 years. After World War II, he moved to Baltimore.

Burgess worked for Martin Marietta for 33 years. He worked as a senior finance analyst.

Burgess was a Democrat. He served as a member of the Maryland House of Delegates, representing District 9, from 1979 to 1982. He then represented District 8 in the Maryland House of Delegates from 1983 to 1990. In 1990, Burgess was defeated in re-election for the Maryland House of Delegates.

Burgess served five years as president of the Hillbrook Camelot Improvement Association and six years as president of the Greater Rosedale Community Council.

Personal life
Burgess married Essie E. Perry in 1950. They had one son and two daughters, William J. III, Susan A. and Natalie E. Burgess died following heart problems on September 25, 1996, at the age of 76, at his home in Rosedale, Maryland.

References

1920s births
Year of birth uncertain
1996 deaths
Politicians from Boston
People from Baltimore County, Maryland
Johns Hopkins University alumni
American military personnel of World War II
Martin Marietta people
Democratic Party members of the Maryland House of Delegates